Wurm is a river in the state of North Rhine-Westphalia in western Germany.

Wurm or Würm may also refer to:

Arts, media and entertainment
 Wurm (album), an album by Wolfgang
 Würm (band), an American sludge metal band
 Wurm (dragon) or European dragon, a legendary creature in folklore and mythology
 Wurm: Journey to the Center of the Earth, a 1991 video game for the NES
 Wurm Online, a fantasy MMORPG
 Wurm, a novel by Matthew J. Costello
 Wurm, a fictional character in the opera Luisa Miller by Giuseppe Verdi
 "Würm", the final movement of the song "Starship Trooper" by Yes
 WURM, former name of WRTO-FM, a radio station in Florida, US

Places
 1785 Wurm, a main-belt asteroid
 Würm, a river in Bavaria, Germany
 Würm glaciation, a glacial period named for the river
 Würm (Nagold), a small river in Baden-Württemberg, Germany

Other uses
 Wurm-thional, a trade name for phenothiazine
 Wurm (surname), people with the surname

See also
 Worm (disambiguation)
 Wyrm (disambiguation)
 Wurmser (disambiguation)